Gheorghe Barcu (born 1934) is a Romanian former professional footballer who played as a defender. Barcu played in the Divizia A for Progresul Oradea, Dinamo Obor București and Știința Timișoara. In 1956, with Barcu on the pitch, Progresul Oradea won the Cupa României, after a 2–0 win against Energia Câmpia Turzii.

Honours
Progresul Oradea
Divizia B: 1955
Cupa României: 1956
Știința Timișoara
Divizia B: 1959–60

References

External links
Gheorghe Barcu at labtof.ro

1934 births
Living people
Sportspeople from Brașov
Romanian footballers
Association football defenders
Liga I players
Liga II players
CA Oradea players
Victoria București players
FC Politehnica Timișoara players